Tarucus balkanicus, the Balkan Pierrot or little tiger blue, is a small butterfly that belongs to the lycaenids or blues family. It is found in Mauritania, Niger (the Aïr region), Sudan (Khartoum), Uganda, Saudi Arabia, the United Arab Emirates, Oman, North Africa, the Balkans, western Asia, parts of central Asia and in India. The habitat consists of very arid savanna.

The larvae feed on Ziziphus species.

Subspecies
T. b. balkanicus (Mauritania, Niger: Aïr region, Sudan, Uganda, Saudi Arabia, United Arab Emirates, Oman, Algeria, south-eastern Europe, Asia Minor, Middle East, Syria, Iran, North Africa)
T. b. areshana Bethune-Baker, [1918] (Kopet-Dagh)
T. b. alternatus Moore, 1882 (Ghissar, Darvaz)
T. b. nigra Bethune-Baker, 1918- Black-spotted pierrot (Baluchistan, Saurasthtra, Delhi, Peshawar, Simla Hills, C.India)

Description

Underside: Tailed.White with a prominent black streak from the base of both wings. Markings normally black. Continuous sub marginal bands of connected black streaks.

Upperside: Male always with discal spots and spot at cell-end on forewing. Mostly dark blue with a narrow border.

Female: Brownish grey with dark markings.

See also
Lycaenidae
List of butterflies of India
List of butterflies of India (Lycaenidae)

References

Further reading
 Evans, W.H. (1932) The Identification of Indian Moths. (2nd Ed), Bombay Natural History Society, Mumbai, India
 Gaonkar, Harish (1996) Moths of the Western Ghats, India (including Sri Lanka) - A Biodiversity Assessment of a threatened mountain system. Journal of the Bombay Natural History Society. 
 Gay, Thomas; Kehimkar, Isaac & Punetha, J.C.(1992) Common Moths of India. WWF-India and Oxford University Press, Mumbai, India.
 Haribal, Meena (1994) Moths of Sikkim Himalaya and their Natural History.
 Kunte, Krushnamegh (2005) Moths of Peninsular India. Universities Press.
 Wynter-Blyth, M.A. (1957) Moths of the Indian Region, Bombay Natural History Society, Mumbai, India.

Tarucus
Butterflies described in 1885
Butterflies of Europe
Butterflies of Africa
Butterflies of Asia